Old Broom is a  nature reserve north of Risby in Suffolk. It is managed by the Suffolk Wildlife Trust.

This is a remnant of an ancient wood-pasture landscape with oak pollards between 250 and 500 years old. The dead wood and hollow centres of these trees provide a habitat for fungi and invertebrates, while the bark hosts mosses and lichens.

There is no public access to this site.

References

Suffolk Wildlife Trust